Ronald Lee Bennington (born December 31, 1958) is an American radio personality and comedian who is currently the co-host of Bennington and host of Unmasked. Additionally, he has been a co-host of a number of radio shows, including The Ron and Ron Show and The Ron and Fez Show with Fez Whatley.

Radio career

Ron and Ron (1987–1997)
In 1986, Bennington opened the Ron Bennington's Comedy Scene in Clearwater, Florida; he met Ron Diaz, on whose radio show he plugged his club, and quickly the two created the morning radio program The Ron and Ron Show at Tampa Bay's WYNF-FM, known as 95YNF. The show had huge ratings success and Ron & Ron known as "Radio's Bad Boys" then partnered with their agent Ross Reback to form The Ron & Ron Radio Network to own and syndicate the programming. The show's final broadcast for WYNF was on March 12, 1993. Reback became President and CEO of the newly formed network and quickly negotiated a deal to broadcast the show in Miami, Orlando, and Jacksonville, with another dozen markets soon following (including a new more lucrative deal in Tampa). Ron Diaz announced his departure in early 1997, and on September 29, 1997 the show ended.

Ron and Fez (1997–2015)

After The Ron & Ron Show ended Bennington teamed up with Fez Whatley to create The Ron and Fez Show. After stints in Daytona Beach, New York City, and Washington, D.C., the show was broadcast from New York City (originally briefly called "Ron and Fez dot com" as it was devoted to discussing Web sites) on 102.7 FM WNEW-FM from 2000–2003, and syndicated to additional FM stations toward the end of the run, until the station ended the talk format, and eventually moved to 106.7 FM WJFK-FM near Washington D.C. where it aired live from 2003–2005, a station that had been simulcasting the WNEW-based show since 2000. Bennington and Whatley moved back to New York and debuted on XM Satellite Radio on September 12, 2005.

On April 1, 2015, Fez announced his retirement, with their final show being April 3.

Bennington (2014–Present)
In October 2014 he began co-hosting Bennington with his daughter Gail. The show initially aired on the Opie with Jim Norton Friday 7–10:00 am time slot when Opie and Norton were off.

In April 2015, following the retirement of Fez Whatley, Bennington began airing five days a week, in Ron and Fez's noon–3:00pm time slot, in addition to their Friday spot on Opie Radio.

Other radio ventures
Ron Bennington Interviews is a weekend program on XM which replays different interviews every week which Ron conducts. The show runs on Sirius XM Indie.

In 2007, Bennington began Unmasked, a solo venture which has one-on-one interviews with comedy legends and established and emerging comedic talents.

The Disciples of Comedy
In the mid-1990s Ron Bennington assembled a comedy troupe to tour to the markets where The Ron & Ron Show was syndicated. Ron Bennington's Disciples of Comedy included several comedians who had previously toured as part of Sam Kinison's Outlaws of Comedy. The Disciples of Comedy were Ron Bennington, Carl LaBove, Jimmy Shubert, Mitchell Walters, Dan Carlson, Lou Angelwolf, Jeff Apploff, Ralph Williams, and Curtain Boy Warren Durso. The shows also included Fez Whatley and Fast Eddie Yarb. The tour was produced by Ross Reback and The Ron & Ron Radio Network. The comedy tour sold out theatres of 2,000 to 3,000 seats.

With Ross Reback he co-owned Ron Bennington's Comedy Scene, a comedy club in Clearwater. One of the comics he says "earned his chops" there is Jim Breuer.

Appearances
Bennington is a cigar aficionado and has also been interviewed in Cigar Magazine.

Bennington has a cupcake named for him at Molly's Cupcakes locations, which is chocolate cupcake made with a combination of peanut butter filling, chocolate ganache, and crushed butterscotch topping. In 2008 it was the best-selling cupcake at Molly's.

In 2015, it was revealed on the Bennington Show that an American racing Greyhound had been named after Bennington and registered as "Ron Bennington". Owned by Melissa Skrivseth-Schmidt and Christopher Straka, "Ron Bennington" began her racing career at the Iowa Greyhound Park and raced her first official race at Daytona Beach Kennel Club and Poker Room.

References

External links

 

1959 births
Living people
American male comedians
American talk radio hosts
Radio personalities from Philadelphia
Radio personalities from Tampa, Florida
20th-century American comedians
21st-century American comedians
People from Marcus Hook, Pennsylvania